The 41st General Assembly of Prince Edward Island was in session from March 20, 1928, to July 2, 1931. The Liberal Party led by Albert Charles Saunders formed the government. After Saunders was named a judge, Walter Lea became party leader and Premier in 1930.

David McDonald was elected speaker.

There were four sessions of the 41st General Assembly:

Members

Kings

Prince

Queens

Notes:

References
  Election results for the Prince Edward Island Legislative Assembly, 1927-06-25
 O'Handley, Kathryn Canadian Parliamentary Guide, 1994 

Terms of the General Assembly of Prince Edward Island
1928 establishments in Prince Edward Island
1931 disestablishments in Prince Edward Island